Serranía de Majé is a mountain range located in Panama and extends from Panama Province to the zone that borders the Darién Province. It is located 100 km west of Panama City.

References 

Mountain ranges of Panama
Geography of Panamá Province